The Epilepsy Association of Sierra Leone (EASL) is a non-profit organization based in Sierra Leone. The Epilepsy Association of Sierra Leone aims to establish medical assistance and training for the benefit of the indigenous population who have Epilepsy.

Objectives
EASL was  established with passion to counter act epilepsy at grass root level. The association aims to train the local health care officers, community workers, enrolled nurses & other volunteers. More than 300 members have been successfully trained technically to treat patients. Through its programs EASL strives to achieve the following:
To bring awareness amongst the locals and treat epilepsy as a medical condition.
To ensure availability of anti-epileptic medication.
To perform outreach programs and provide support to the people with the disease.

Areas
EASL has been successful in establishing treatment centers across 13 districts in Sierra Leone. Alongside the association also has 21 outreach treatment centers working towards the treatment of epilepsy.

Collaborators
In order to achieve the task of training local health care workers EASL has associated with other governmental and non governmental bodies. The list is as follows:
Medical Assistance Sierra Leone (MASL)
Evangelical Fellowship of Sierra Leone (EFSL)
Ministry of Health and Sanitation (MOH)
St. Joseph Catholic Sisters

References

External links 
 

Epilepsy organizations
Disability organisations based in Sierra Leone